Prooppia is a genus of parasitic flies in the family Tachinidae.

Species
Prooppia crassiseta (Aldrich & Webber, 1924)
Prooppia latipalpis (Shima, 1981)
Prooppia nigripalpis (Robineau-Desvoidy, 1848)
Prooppia strigifrons (Zetterstedt, 1838)
Prooppia stulta (Zetterstedt, 1844)

References

Diptera of Europe
Diptera of Asia
Diptera of North America
Exoristinae
Tachinidae genera
Taxa named by Charles Henry Tyler Townsend